This is a list of fellows of the Royal Society elected in 1685.

Fellows 
Esprit Cabart de Villermont  (1617–1707)
Sir Richard Bulkeley  (1660–1710)
John Vaughan 3rd Earl of Carbery (1639–1713)
Charles Leigh  (1662–1717)
John Beaumont  (d. 1731)
Thomas Herbert 8th Earl of Pembroke and 5th Earl of Montgomery (1656–1733)
Sir Hans Sloane  (1660–1753)

References

1685
1685 in science
1685 in England